LAPTV (Latin American Pay Television Service) was a Latin American pay television company founded by many cable providers of the region (MVS Comunicaciones, Grupo Cisneros) and many cinema producers/distributors (such as United International Pictures, distributor of Paramount Pictures and Universal Studios). It runs several film and television series channels, such as Cinecanal and Film Zone, and previously Moviecity.

History
LAPTV was formed as a partnership between Metro-Goldwyn-Mayer, Paramount Pictures, and Fox in Latin America in 1993 with Universal Studios joining later. On May 22, 2012, Fox International Channels acquired MGM's stake in LAP TV. In March 2013, Fox purchased Paramount's position in the company, thus becoming the sole owner of LAP TV, and sign a content agreement with LAP TV.
Starting on November 3, 2014, all the Premium channels of the pack were rebranded as "Fox+", dropping the "Movie City" brand definitely, and consolidating the Fox brand in LAPTV with the operations in Fox International Channels. Operations of Cinecanal and Film Zone were unaffected.

Channels

Basic-tier channels 
Cinecanal (1993–present): Mix of new releases and slightly older films, also shows films previously shown on Moviecity/Fox+ and before any other basic-tier pay-TV channel. Before 2010 it was part of the premium-labelled networks of the company.

Defunct Brands 
Film Zone (1999-2017): Offered 3 independent films from the Sundance Channel and films previously shown on Moviecity/Fox+ and Cinecanal.
Moviecity (1997 - November 3, 2014): New releases only
Cinecanal 2 (1997 - 2007): Mix of new releases and slightly older films
Cinecanal Classics (2004 - 2009): Classic movies

References

External links
 (Defunct, redirects to Fox International Channels Latin America website)
Official Site 

Television stations in the United States
Fox Networks Group
The Walt Disney Company subsidiaries

Former_News_Corporation_subsidiaries